Prarambha (translation: Beginning) is a 2007 Indian short film directed by Santosh Sivan and funded by Bill Gates foundation. The film stars Prabhu Deva, Skandha and B. Saroja Devi in the lead roles.

The movie premiered at Toronto International Film Festival in 2007.

The movie screened for the first time in India on 1 December 2007 at 38th International Film Festival of India.

Overview 
The film was a part of Mira Nair's noble project AIDS Jaago (AIDS Awake), a series of four short films, Prarambha (directed by Santosh Sivan, Migration (directed by Mira Nair), Positive (directed by Farhan Akhtar) and Blood Brothers (directed by Vishal Bhardwaj) in a joint initiative of Mira Nair's Mirabai Films, voluntary organisations Avahan and Bill & Melinda Gates Foundation with a view of generating awareness about HIV/AIDS. The film was made for Richard Gere’s AIDS foundation. The film was entirely shot on location in and around Mysore.

The film, directed by Santosh Sivan, is about a truck driver (Prabhu Deva) who helps a boy (Skandha) in his quest for the person who gave him birth, and then helps get him reinstated in school, from which he had been dismissed for also being HIV-positive. Prabhu Deva, the male protagonist, plays the role of a truck driver in the film.

Plot 
The story of the film begins when Puttaswamy (Prabhu Deva), a truck driver, arrives at his place in Mysore. Puttaswamy discovers a little boy Kittu (Skandha) in the back of his truck. Kittu is on a journey to find his mother (Anu Prabhakar), who left him upon discovering that she was HIV positive.

The next scene involves a call-girl (played by Ramya) trying to approach Puttaswamy, but he declines her invitation and says he has stopped indulging these days. Meanwhile, she gets troubled by a thug (Sadhu Kokila), a pimp who demands money from her. When Puttaswamy tries to stop the thug, he gets thrashed by him. Suddenly a cop (Jai Jagdeesh) arrives at the place and harasses Puttaswamy for the happenings. Kittu saves him by pretending Puttaswamy is his dad, so Puttaswamy agrees to help the boy find his home. Later, he takes the boy to his home. He discovers that the lady in the house (Chitra Shenoy) is not Kittu's mother, and learns from her that Kittu's mother has been admitted to hospital. Immediately he rushes to the hospital. It turns out the mother is dying of AIDS and doesn't want to face her son.

Kittu refuses to go back home and school, because he was dismissed from his school.

Puttaswamy takes the boy to the house of his grandmother (Jayanthi) and promises that he will take back the boy to his school, but he finds that the school will not admit him back because the boy has contracted HIV from his parents. The Headmistress (B. Saroja Devi) tells some ignorant parents fear it may spread to their children, but she promises to the boy that she will try to take him back.

The school administrators organize an awareness program and educate parents about HIV. Puttaswamy campaigns among parents to change their perceptions, until the school takes the boy back. The story ends when Kittu gets re-admitted to the school.

Cast 
 Prabhu Deva - Puttaswamy Gowda (Truck Driver)
 B. Saroja Devi - School Principal
 Skandha - Kittu
 Jayanthi - Grandmother
 Anu Prabhakar - Mother
 Ramya - Sex Worker
 Sadhu Kokila - Gunda
 Jai Jagadish - Policeman
 Chitra Shenoy - Lady at House
 Avni Jairam - Little Girl
 Lata - Patient
 Nagaratna - Parent
 Pandu - Lawyer
 Savitha - Nurse
 N. G. Usha - Teacher

References

External links 
 
 
 Watch Prarambha online at Youtube.com

2000s Kannada-language films
2007 films
Indian short films
HIV/AIDS in Indian films